The Eternal Sin is a lost 1917 American silent historical drama film directed by Herbert Brenon and starring Florence Reed. Brenon produced and Lewis J. Selznick handled the distribution.

Cast
Florence Reed - Lucretia Borgia
William E. Shay - The Duke of Ferrara
Stephen Grattan - Her Brother
Richard Barthelmess - Gennaro
Alexander Shannon - Rustighello
A. G. Parker - Maffio
M. J. Briggs - Astolpo
Edward Thorne - Jeppo
Elmer Patterson - Liveretto
Anthony Merlo - Petrucci
Henry Armetta - The Jester
William Welsh - Gubetta
Juliet Brenon - Blanca
Jane Fearnley - Princess Negroni
Henrietta Gilbert - Flametta

References

External links
The Eternal Sin at IMDb.com

1917 films
American silent feature films
Films based on works by Victor Hugo
Films directed by Herbert Brenon
Lost American films
American black-and-white films
Lost drama films
1917 lost films
1910s historical drama films
American historical drama films
Selznick Pictures films
1917 drama films
1910s American films
Silent American drama films